William Francis Stuart Jardine (20 March 1924 – 22 October 1999) was a  British professional ice hockey player. He played as a forward for the Glasgow Mohawks in the Scottish National League, and represented Great Britain at the 1948 Winter Olympics in Saint-Moritz. He was born in Glasgow, Scotland, United Kingdom.

References

1924 births
1999 deaths
Ice hockey players at the 1948 Winter Olympics
Olympic ice hockey players of Great Britain
Scottish ice hockey forwards
Sportspeople from Glasgow